Lindra is a genus of skippers in the family Hesperiidae.

Species
Recognised species in the genus Lindra include:
 Lindra simulius (Druce, 1876)

References

Natural History Museum Lepidoptera genus database

Hesperiini
Hesperiidae genera